Chaetomium cellulolyticum is a fungus in the genus Chaetomium. It is associated with the production of cellulase.

References

cellulolyticum
Taxa named by David Leslie Hawksworth